Gary R. Fallon (April 3, 1939 – April 29, 1995) was an American gridiron football player and coach. He played college football at Syracuse University and spent a year playing for the Hamilton Tiger-Cats of the Canadian Football League (CFL). American served as the head football coach at Washington and Lee University in Lexington, Virginia from 1978 to 1994, compiling a record of 77–84–1.

Fallon was still Washington & Lee's coach when he died suddenly from a heart attack at the age of 56.

Head coaching record

References

1939 births
1995 deaths
American football fullbacks
American players of Canadian football
Atlantic Coast Football League players
Hamilton Tiger-Cats players
Ithaca Bombers football coaches
Syracuse Orange football players
Princeton Tigers football coaches
United Football League (1961–1964) players
Washington and Lee Generals football coaches
People from Watertown, New York